Aarne Jonatan Hytönen (10 October 1901, Turku - 29 April 1972) was a Finnish architect. He is best known for designing the Töölö Sports Hall and the Olympia Terminal in Helsinki together with Risto-Veikko Luukkonen, both of which are listed by Docomomo as significant examples of modern architecture in Finland.

Works
 Töölö Sports Hall, Helsinki (1935) – together with Risto-Veikko Luukkonen
 Finnish pavilion at the Brussels International Exposition (1935) – together with Risto-Veikko Luukkonen
 Suomi-yhtiö office building, Helsinki (1938) – together with Risto-Veikko Luukkonen
 Olympia Terminal, Helsinki (1953) – together with Risto-Veikko Luukkonen
 Ii Church (1950) – together with Gustav Strandberg
 Valkeakoski Town Hall (1955) – together with Risto-Veikko Luukkonen

References

External links

1901 births
1972 deaths
People from Turku
People from Turku and Pori Province (Grand Duchy of Finland)
20th-century Finnish architects